The Aspen Words Literary Prize, established in 2018, is an annual literary award presented by Aspen Words, a literary center in Aspen, Colorado. The prize is presented to an author for "an influential work of fiction that illuminates a vital contemporary issue and demonstrates the transformative power of literature on thought and culture.” Winners receive a $35,000 prize.

Recipients

References 

English-language literary awards
Awards established in 2018
Fiction awards
International literary awards